Luigi Luvoni (1859–1904) was an Italian engineer and painter.

Biography
Born in Lombardy, he exhibited in 1883 at Milan: Lasciami pregar vivo l'angelo che pinto amai; inspired by the Cantico dei Cantici by Felice Cavallotti; Due amici; Facciamo la pace; Fiori del' convento. In 1883 at Rome, in 1883, Garibaldi; Portrait of bambina; and Lungo il naviglio; in 1884 at Turin, Allo studio ; Al lavoro ; and Un dominò rosa. In 1886 at Milan, he displayed: I nostri bisnonni; Diana e Tom; and Bagnanti. His wife, Giuseppina Lorioli, was the subject of a painting by Daniele Ranzoni. Luvoni collected artworks and his collection was endowed to city of Milan.

References

1846 births
1900 deaths
19th-century Italian painters
Italian male painters
20th-century Italian painters
20th-century Italian male artists
Painters from Milan
19th-century Italian male artists